The 2007 Nigerian Senate election in Osun State was held on 21 April 2007, to elect members of the Nigerian Senate to represent Osun State. Simeon Oduoye representing Osun Central, Isiaka Adetunji Adeleke representing Osun West and Iyiola Omisore representing Osun East all won on the platform of the People's Democratic Party.

Overview

Summary

Results

Osun Central 
The election was won by Simeon Oduoye of the Peoples Democratic Party (Nigeria).

Osun West 
The election was won by Isiaka Adetunji Adeleke of the Peoples Democratic Party (Nigeria).

Osun East 
The election was won by Iyiola Omisore of the Peoples Democratic Party (Nigeria).

References 

April 2007 events in Nigeria
Osun State Senate elections
Osu